Chalappally is a village in Pathanamthitta, Kerala, India, between the towns of Ranni and Mallappally. Most of its residents work in rubber plantations and agriculture.

References 

Villages in Pathanamthitta district